KSEK (1340 AM, "My Country 107.9") is an AM radio station licensed to Pittsburg, Kansas.

History
On December 19, 1946, the Pittsburg Publishing Company—a subsidiary of Stauffer Communications that owned the city's two newspapers, the Pittsburg Sun (morning) and Pittsburg Daily Headlight (evening)—was granted a construction permit from the Federal Communications Commission to build a new 250-watt radio station on 1340 kHz in the city. The station began broadcasting on July 11, 1947. from studios inside the Hotel Besse on East 4th Street.

KSEK changed over from an informational talk format to Fox Sports Radio on or around August 19, 2013.

Prior to its previous sports format, the station aired formats such as news/talk, adult standards, adult contemporary and classic country.

In January 2022, KSEK rebranded as "Sports Radio 107.9" and switched affiliations from Fox Sports Radio to CBS Sports Radio.

On October 21, 2022 KSEK changed their format from sports to country, branded as "My Country 107.9".

Previous logo

References

External links

SEK (AM)
Radio stations established in 1947
1947 establishments in Kansas
Pittsburg, Kansas
Country radio stations in the United States